Phytoecia erythrocnema is a species of beetle in the family Cerambycidae. It was described by Hippolyte Lucas in 1847. It is known from Portugal, France, Algeria, Spain, Morocco, and Tunisia It feeds on Daucus carota.

References

Phytoecia
Beetles described in 1847